Olunloyo is a Nigerian surname. Notable people with this surname include:

 Folake Olunloyo, Nigerian politician
 Kemi Omololu-Olunloyo (born 1964), Nigerian journalist, blogger, and activist
 Victor Omololu Olunloyo (born 1935), Nigerian mathematician

Surnames of Nigerian origin